Rutebok for Norge is an overview of the entire Norwegian public transport network containing timetables, prices, maps and other essential information. It also contains a list of Norwegian accommodation.

Rutebok for Norge was first published in 1869 under the name "Norges Kommunikasjoner" or "Reiseblad". It got its current name in 1918 when it was merged with the state railways equivalent. The Rutebok was issued weekly 1880–1932, later every 14 days. It has been published since 1991 by Norsk Reiseinformasjon AS with 4 issues per year. Since 1994 an electronic version is also published, in the form of a CD-ROM containing the same information as the paper version; since 2003 it has also been available online at http://www.rutebok.no.

External links
 Norsk Reiseinformasjon AS
 Rutebok.no

Public transport in Norway
Route planning websites
Publications established in 1869
1869 establishments in Norway